Bikramganj is a nagar panchayat city and corresponding community development block of Rohtas district, Bihar, India. As of 2011, the city of Bikramganj had a population of 48,465, in 7,968 households, while the overall subdistrict had a population of 163,565. The city of Bikramganj has a slum called Dhangai which, in 2011 had a population of 3,955 in 637 households.

It is an old local center for commercial activities developed at the cross roads connecting Patna to Sasaram and Buxar to Dehri-on-Sone. This crossing is  known as Bikramganj Chowk - quite an obvious landmark there. It is an emerging rurban hub. Located at a "less industrialised" north of Rohtas district, surrounded with well irrigated fertile fields which bestow Rohtas the title of "Rice bowl of Bihar". 

There is a good railway station on Dehri road which connects the local populace to the nearby cities of Patna, Sasaram and Varanasi. Various Banks have open their units here as commercial activities are generating growth. 

Once a mundane rural town, Bikramganj is trying best to catch up with the developments happening around and India. A natural river called "Kao" flows through the town and tributes to Ganga in Buxar. People with all religions live here, however Hindu are in majority. "Chhath" is a major festival here although Bikramganj is known for "Durga Puja Mela" when all four roads compete for the best pandals..and young folks throng the Chowk area. 

Local delicacy is "LITTI with Chokkha" and famous sweet item is "Chhena ka khurma". Nearby towns are Suryapura, Karakat, Koath, Maliyabagh and Sanjhauli. Weather is humid sub tropical, good for Rice cultivation."Katarni" is famous variety of rice grown around Bikramganj.

Demographics 

In 2011, the total population of Bikramganj block was 163,565. Of these, 48,565 lived in the city of Bikramganj and 115,100 lived in rural areas. The overall population of the block increased from 136,703 in 2001 to 163,565 in 2011, representing a 19.6% increase over the decade.

The sex ratio of Bikramganj was 882 in 2011, the lowest among cities in Rohtas district. The sex ratio was higher in rural areas, with 911 females for every 1000 males (the second-lowest ratio in Rohtas, ahead of Kargahar), bringing the overall sex ratio of the sub-district to 902. Again, this value was the lowest in Rohtas. The sub-district's sex ratio was also 902 among the 0-6 age group, again the lowest in Rohtas, but the distribution was somewhat different: the ratio was 894 in the city of Bikramganj itself and 906 in rural villages.

The literacy rate of Bikramganj city was 74.76% in 2011, which was slightly below the Rohtas urban average of 78.35%. Literacy was higher in men than in women, with 81.37% of males but only 67.26% of females able to read and write; the corresponding 14.11% literacy gender gap was slightly above the district urban average of 13.33%. In rural parts of Bikramganj block, the literacy rate was 74.96%, slightly above the district rural average of 72.5%, with 85.56% of men and 63.33% of women able to read and write. The combined literacy rate of the entire sub-district of Bikramganj was 74.90%, slightly above the district average of 73.37%.

Amenities 
The city of Bikramganj had one hospital as of 2011, along with two movie theatres, ten nationalised banks,three private banks and a community centre. The town did not have a public library at the time.

All 80 inhabited villages in Bikramganj block had drinking water in 2011, but only 3 of them had tap water; most villages instead got water via well or hand pump. 57 villages had schools, serving 93.35% of the rural population. 20 had medical facilities, serving 44.69% of the rural population, and 31 had telephone access, serving 60.66% of the rural population. 10 villages had banks, 8 had agricultural credit societies, and 51 had permanent pucca roads. 58 villages had electrical power, serving 89.75% of the rural population.

Educational uinstitutions

Bikramganj has some of the good Govt. aided and Private educational institutions as follows:

Anjabit Singh College

Anjabit Singh College, Bikramganj is one of the prestigious and oldest constituent college of  Veer Kunwar Singh University (V.K.S.U.), Arrah, established in 1957. By Late Shri Nepal Singh, a resident of Dhawan village of Bikramganj sub-division, Rohtas. At the very outset, Justice Anand Singh and Justice Kainhaiya Singh were the members of the Governing body of this college. Shri Vishwanath Singh was the founder principal of this college. The college is imparting education in Arts and Science up to Degree levels along with post-graduate teaching in History and Economics in the faculty of Arts. It is also running B.C.A. course under the vocational/professional program. The college has well-equipped science laboratories and adequate library, separate common rooms and toilets for boys and girls. Admissions are taken on the basis of released cut marks by college.Some alumini are Manoj Singh Sonbhadra,

Dr. N Jha Mahila College
Keeping the betterment of the students when it comes to academic, physical and mental progress paramount is Dr. N Jha Mahila College in Rohtas. From the moment it laid its foundation in the ground the establishment became a recognized educational institute in the city. Its eminence lies not just in the academic success of its students but also in their all-around personality and the enhanced sense of maturity at a young age. Widening their horizon when it comes to their studies as well as their code of conduct when interacting with fellow mates, the college takes the initiative of molding them into better citizens. Overlooking the heart of the city, the college is considerably convenient for a number of its students.

DAV Public School
Established in the year 2008, DAV Public School is located in Rural area of Bihar state/ut of India. School is providing Secondary level education and is being managed by Private Unaided Organisation. The medium of instruction is English language and school is Co-educational. The school is affiliated with Central Board of Secondary Education (CBSE) for secondary level.

Sr. Sec. High School Tenduni
Established in the year 1975, Sr. Sec. H S Tenduni is located in Urban area of Bihar state/ut of India. In Tenduni area of Bikramganj block of Rohtas district. The school is providing Secondary, High Secondary (9-12) level education and is being managed by the Department of Education.
The medium of instruction is Hindi language and school is Co-educational. It is affiliated with State Board Bihar School Examination Board for both secondary and high secondary level.Some alumini are Manoj Singh Sonbhadra,Neeraj Singh,Ajay Singh

Utkarmit High School, Ghusia Kalan
Established in the year 1950, upgraded H S Ghusia Kalan is located in Rural area of Bihar state/ut of India. In Ghusia Kalan area of Bikramganj block of Rohtas district. The school is providing secondary level education and is being managed by the Department of Education. The medium of instruction is Hindi language and school is Co-educational. The school is affiliated with State Board Bihar School Examination Board for secondary level.

Krishna Sudarshan Public School
Established in the year 2008, Krishna Sudarshan Public School is located in Urban area of Bihar state/ut of India. School is providing Upper primary level education and is being managed by Unrecognised Body.
The medium of instruction is English language and school is Co-educational.This school is located near south side of Bikramganj Railway Station. Some alumni from this school are Rajnish Gulandhiya, Sabi Raje, Ankit Aditya ,Vishwajeet Mouar, Aman Lal ,Amit singh

St. S.n. Global School
The co-educational English medium school provides basic infrastructures to its students like classrooms for all classes separately, laboratory, library facilities, having its own playground to encourage its students in various indoor and outdoor sports and games. Admissions in English medium under CBSE syllabus is provided by the school from Class 1 to High School.

The Divine Public School
The Divine Public School Affiliated to C.B.S.E Delhi is run and managed by "Radhika Sriniwas Educational and Welfare Trust" a registered academic and social institution. The school was started in April 2011. This school is a unique and quality oriented co-educational school for the sake of children from standard Pre Nursery to class X, located in calm, pleasant and pollution free atmosphere at Bikramganj Rohtas, Bihar. It is designed to impact integrated education to children. Highly motivated, dedicated and competent staffs are selected to create a better academic atmosphere. The system of the D.P.S Bikramganj Rohtas, Bihar is completely based on the Central Board of Secondary Education (C.B.S.E) pattern. During this modern computer era, it is very much essential to have a proper and good knowledge of computer. Nowadays, computer is part and parcel of life. The School is well-equipped computer lab to provide enough practical knowledge of computer. Availability of generator fulfills the scarcity of electricity.

Villages 
Besides the city of Bikramganj, there are 100 villages in Bikrambanj block. Of these, 80 are inhabited, with a total rural population of 115,100.

See also
Ghusia Kalan

References

Cities and towns in Rohtas district